United Arab Airlines Flight 869 was an international scheduled passenger flight operated by a de Havilland DH-106 Comet 4C from Hong Kong via Bangkok to Cairo. On 19 July 1962 at 13:30 UTC, the plane departed from Hong Kong for the first leg of the flight with 18 passengers and 8 crew aboard. The flight was uneventful until commencing approach to Bangkok, when the plane crashed in the Khao Yai mountain range 96 km NE of Bangkok at 15:44 UTC. There were no survivors.

The investigation found as a probable cause a sequence of mistakes in the navigation by the pilot-in-command, which "resulted in grave errors of time and distance in his computations".

Aircraft 
The aircraft was a de Havilland DH-106 Comet 4C with construction number 6464, delivered to United Arab Airlines in 1962. At the time of the accident, it had been in service with the airline for only three months.

It was equipped with dual VOR receivers, Doppler and automatic direction finders.

Accident 
Flight 869 took off from Hong Kong Kai Tak Airport for the first leg of its journey to Cairo. 

At 15:08 UTC, the aircraft entered the Bangkok Flight Information Region boundary, and established contact with Bangkok Air Traffic Control at 15:14. Upon initial contact, the flight advised ATC that they had passed the Ubol NDB at 15:13 UTC, and requested to fly direct to the Bangkok VOR. This request was granted, and at 15:17, the crew reported their estimated time of arrival (ETA) at the VOR as 15:47. A further report gave the ETA of their crossing at the  perimeter from the VOR at 15:30 UTC.

The aircraft reported that they crossed the 100-mile perimeter at 15:29, switching to Bangkok Control. Upon initial contact with Bangkok control at 15:30, the crew requested descent, reporting their position to be  out from the VOR. Bangkok Control then instructed the crew to descend to  while tracking on the 073 radial of the Bangkok VOR. This instruction was acknowledged by the crew. During the descent, the crew was advised of the weather conditions at Bangkok and to contact Bangkok Approach control at 15:39 UTC.

Bangkok Approach Control took responsibility for the aircraft at 15:40 UTC. Approach control cleared the aircraft for an approach to runway 21R after crossing the VOR. 

Contact was lost at 15:50. It was estimated the aircraft crashed at 15:44-15:45 UTC.

Investigation 
Using this ground speed, the aircraft was actually  from the Bangkok VOR instead of the  during the position report at 15:39.

References

Sources
 

Aviation accidents and incidents in 1962
Aviation accidents and incidents in Thailand
Airliner accidents and incidents involving controlled flight into terrain
Airliner accidents and incidents caused by pilot error
Accidents and incidents involving the de Havilland Comet
869
1962 in Egypt
July 1962 events in Asia